Blaire Erskine (born August 25, 1991) is an American comedian and writer. She is best known for her satirical Twitter videos spoofing various right-wing political figures and fictional Trump supporters. Erskine is a staff writer for Jimmy Kimmel Live!.

Career 
Erskine moved to Atlanta in 2011 to attend Georgia State University and began taking improv classes. She pursued acting for two years before turning her focus to writing. She joined an all-women stand-up comedy class at The Punchline in 2017 and started doing open mics around Atlanta.

Erskine regularly performed stand-up comedy in Atlanta prior to the COVID-19 pandemic's social distancing requirements. She is also a contributing writer to Reductress and The List.

She rose to prominence in 2020 for posting satirical Twitter videos in response to current events, often posing as the wives and daughters of prominent right wing politicians and pundits and various Trump supporting characters. In her first viral video released in July 2020, she depicted the wife of Dan Maples, a Florida man who received media attention for refusing to wear a mask in Costco. Another viral video depicted her giving a fake news interview as a Trump supporter stranded in freezing temperatures after an Omaha, Nebraska rally, spoofing a real event that took place in October 2020. Celebrities such as Michael Moore, MC Hammer, and reporter Katie Couric responded to the video assuming it was real. 

Characters she has played in her videos include Jerry Falwell's daughter, Amy Coney Barrett's daughter, Tom Cotton's wife, Corey Lewandowski's wife, Marjorie Taylor Greene's daughter, and Tiffany Trump's best friend. A.O. Scott of the New York Times referred to the videos as "small masterpieces, flawlessly capturing the attitudes and techniques we use when we’re alone with our phones." 

Erskine used her platform to help raise $25,000 for Raphael Warnock and Jon Ossoff's 2020 Georgia Senate campaigns.

In December 2020, Erskine signed to the talent agency ICM Partners. In 2021 Erskine joined the writing staff of Jimmy Kimmel Live!. She continued to produce viral parody videos on her social media accounts, including one posing as a fictional spokesperson for Facebook, after a whistleblower came forward about the company's financial motives, and another as a spokesperson for ERCOT, in response to the electricity issues resulting from a heatwave in June.

Personal life 
Erskine was raised on a sod farm in the small town of Ellaville, Georgia. She married her husband in October 2020. They reside in Los Angeles, California.

Filmography

Awards and nominations

References

External links 
 Official website

Living people
American women comedians
American stand-up comedians
Actresses from Georgia (U.S. state)
People from Schley County, Georgia
21st-century American women writers
Comedians from Georgia (U.S. state)
American satirists
Georgia State University alumni
1991 births
American women television writers